Batman: Haunted Knight is an anthology trade paperback published by DC Comics in 1996. It reprinted three one-shot specials from the previous three years (three Batman: Legends of the Dark Knight Halloween Specials). Each of the stories was written by Jeph Loeb and featured art by Tim Sale. The popularity of these three stories led to the three miniseries Batman: The Long Halloween #1-13, Batman: Dark Victory #0-13 and Catwoman: When in Rome #1-6.

Plot
During the story "Fears", Batman is hunting down and trying to capture the Scarecrow. As the title suggests, fear plays a large part in the story, with Batman nearly dying of fear while trapped in a large, poisonous thorn maze.

"Madness" tells the story of Captain James Gordon's daughter, Barbara, being kidnapped by the Mad Hatter and forced to participate in a twisted tea party with other kidnapped children. Batman and Gordon finally save Barbara and bring down the Mad Hatter.

"Ghosts" is a Batman universe version of A Christmas Carol, with Bruce's father Thomas Wayne taking the place of Jacob Marley, and the three spirits being Poison Ivy (the Ghost of Christmas Past), the Joker (the Ghost of Christmas Present), and a Grim Reaper figure (the Ghost of Christmas Yet to Come) who turns out to be Batman's ghost. The message from the spirits is that Bruce should not let Batman take over his entire life.

Background
The graphic novel reprints Batman: Legends of the Dark Knight Halloween Special #1 (1993), Batman: Madness - A Legends Of The Dark Knight Halloween Special (1994), and Batman: Ghosts - A Legends of the Dark Knight Halloween Special (1995) written by Loeb and art by Sale respectively. These stories were specials and spin-offs of Batman: Legends of the Dark Knight series.

Timeline of events 
Little is known of when the stories in Haunted Knight take place in the Loeb/Sale Batman series:
 During the story "Madness", the villain Two-Face is referenced in the line "Joker. Scarecrow. Two-Face. Each has its own private madness that drives them". Two-Face does not appear in the Loeb/Sale series until the end of Batman: The Long Halloween, so this story cannot precede it.
 Catwoman, who was in Rome for six months (Catwoman: When in Rome) following the events of "The Long Halloween" (from Valentine's Day to Thanksgiving in Batman: Dark Victory), but had returned by the end of Dark Victory, is absent, and Jim Gordon still has the rank of captain in the Gotham City Police Department, even though he was promoted to commissioner by the beginning of Dark Victory.
 The stories "Fears" and "Ghosts", especially as they involve Batman's home life, are not likely to take place after Dark Victory, because they make no reference to Dick Grayson / Robin, who had debuted at the end of Dark Victory. All three stories take place on different Halloweens.

Collected editions
The entire series has been collected in trade paperbacks, an absolute edition, and a deluxe edition:
Trade paperback, DC Comics, 1996.
Trade paperback, Titan Books, 1996.
Absolute Edition, hardcover, DC Comics, 2014.
New trade paperback, DC Comics, 2018.
Deluxe Edition, hardcover, DC Comics, 2022.

In other media
 The "Fears" storyline influenced the film Batman Begins. The scene where Batman interrogates Arnold Flass in the rain is similar to a scene in "Fears" in which Batman hangs the Scarecrow's henchman upside down with a rope in order to gain information on the Scarecrow. The quote "Professor Crane isn't here right now. But if you would like to make an appointment..." was used in the film. After capturing the Scarecrow, Bruce returns home to attend a party at Wayne Manor, but is forced to go back out as Batman when the Scarecrow escapes police custody on the same night.
 The Jack-o'-Lantern face made on the Batsignal was used in a nightmare sequence in the 2009 game Batman: Arkham Asylum. 
 In the 2015 game Batman: Arkham Knight, the Jack-o'-Lantern face was used by the Scarecrow when he abducts Robin (Tim Drake) at the movie studio.

Comics by Jeph Loeb
Batman titles
Horror comics
Batman graphic novels
1996 in comics